Chudnovsky is an Ashkenazi Jewish surname of Ukrainian origin (meaning "from/born in Chudnov"). It may refer to

Chudnovsky brothers, David and Gregory, mathematicians
 Chudnovsky algorithm is a fast method for calculating the digits of 
David Chudnovsky (politician) in Canada
Maria Chudnovsky, mathematician
Chudnofsky, the main villain of The Green Hornet (2011 film)